Reginald Arthur Gibbs (7 May 1882 – 28 November 1938) was a Welsh international rugby union wing who played club rugby for Penarth and Cardiff. He was capped 16 times for his country and captained his team on one occasion. Gibbs is one of five Welsh players to have scored four tries in a single game.

International career
Gibbs was first capped for his country in a game against Scotland on 3 February 1906. Wales won the game 9-3, but were completely outplayed by Scotland; the main reason for the Scottish defeat was Gibbs impressive display as a 'rover'. His work with Billy Trew turned the minimal possession Wales had into the three tries the team scored on the day.

In total Gibbs scored 17 tries for his country, establishing a Welsh record which stood until Gareth Edwards broke it in 1976. In his final season, 1911, Gibbs scored five tries as Wales won the Triple Crown and Grand Slam, their last such success for 39 years. He captained Wales once, against Ireland at Lansdowne Road in 1910, scoring a try and leading Wales to 19-3 victory. Gibbs toured Australasia as part of the Arthur Harding's Anglo-Welsh team of 1908. In the 1908 tour, Gibbs played two of the tests and scored the only try for the tourists in the first test.

International matches played
Wales
 1907, 1908, 1910, 1911
 1908, 1910, 1911
 1906, 1908, 1910, 1911
 1906, 1907, 1908, 1910, 1911

British Isles
New Zealand 1908, 1908

Cricket
Gibbs was a keen amateur cricketer and played minor counties cricket for Glamorgan prior to their elevation to first-class status, making 31 appearances in the Minor Counties Championship between 1902–14.

Bibliography

References

1882 births
1938 deaths
Welsh rugby union players
Rugby union players from Cardiff
Rugby union wings
Wales rugby union captains
Cardiff RFC players
Penarth RFC players
Barbarian F.C. players
Wales international rugby union players
Welsh businesspeople in shipping
People educated at Queen's College, Taunton
Glamorgan County RFC players
Welsh cricketers
Glamorgan cricketers
British & Irish Lions rugby union players from Wales
20th-century Welsh businesspeople